Lan Bale and Brett Steven were the defending champions, but Bale did not participate this year.  Steven partnered Tommy Ho, losing in the semifinals.

Todd Woodbridge and Mark Woodforde won in the final 6–3, 6–1, against Sergio Casal and Emilio Sánchez.

Seeds

  Todd Woodbridge /  Mark Woodforde (champions)
  Jim Grabb /  Patrick McEnroe (semifinals)
  Sergio Casal /  Emilio Sánchez (final)
  Tommy Ho /  Brett Steven (semifinals)

Draw

Draw

External links
 Draw

Delray Beach Open
1995 ATP Tour